H. Gordon Barrett (August 20, 1915 – May 30, 1993) was a Canadian politician and safety director. He was elected to the House of Commons of Canada as a Member of the Liberal Party to represent the riding of Lincoln. During the 28th Parliament, he was a member of the Standing Committee on Agriculture. He was defeated in 1972. Prior to his federal political experience, he was a lieutenant in the Canadian Infantry in World War II between 1942 and 1945 and returned to Canada to become a councillor for Thorold, Ontario between 1946 and 1959.

External links
 

1915 births
1993 deaths
Liberal Party of Canada MPs
Members of the House of Commons of Canada from Ontario
People from Thorold